= Mary Chase Barney =

American editor

Mary Chase Barney (1785–1872), was an American editor. She was the manager and editor of the magazine National Magazine in Baltimore in 1829–1831. She attracted much attention as a woman participator in the public political debate in the Antebellum South.

Her magazine was a women's magazine about politics, which was unusual in this period, particularly in the Antebellum South. Her position as a newspaper editor was in itself rare in pre-war South, but she was also controversial for her political involvement, as she participated in the public political debate as a supporter of the Whig party against the Democrats.
